Runa Vikestad (born 13 August 1984 in Finnsnes) is a Norwegian football defender, currently playing for Kolbotn Fotball in the Toppserien. She has also played for IF Fløya and Denmark's Fortuna Hjørring.

From the age of 5 to 16 Vikestad played in boys' football teams at her home on the island of Senja.  She was with Fløya when the club gained promotion to the Toppserien in 2002, and the club then finished in 5th place in 2003 and 3rd in 2004 and 2005.  In 2006, she moved to Denmark and became a league champion with Fortuna Hjørring.  Back in Norway in 2007 with Kolbotn she won the Norwegian Cup, and has captained the club since 2010. 

She has been a member of the Norwegian national team on and off since 2004, taking part in the 2009 European Championship and the 2011 World Cup. She previously played the 2003 U-19 Euro, where Norway reached the final. Vikestad made her debut for Norway in 2008 and has of November 2012 been capped 15 times, scoring one goal.

References

1984 births
Living people
Norwegian women's footballers
Norway women's international footballers
Expatriate men's footballers in Denmark
2011 FIFA Women's World Cup players
Women's association football defenders